Czech Silesia (also , ; ; ; ;) is the part of the historical region of Silesia now in the Czech Republic. Czech Silesia is, together with Bohemia and Moravia, one of the three historical Czech lands.

Silesia lies in the north-east of the Czech Republic, predominantly in the Moravian-Silesian Region, with a section in the northern Olomouc Region. It is almost identical in extent with Austrian Silesia (also known as the Duchy of Upper and Lower Silesia), before 1918; between 1938 and 1945, part of the area was also known as Sudeten Silesia.

Geography

Czech Silesia borders Moravia in the south, Poland (Polish Silesia) in the north (in the northwest the County of Kladsko, until 1742/48 an integral part of Bohemia)  and Slovakia in the southeast. With the city of Ostrava roughly in its geographic center, the area comprises much of the modern region of Moravian-Silesia (save for its southern edges) and, in its far west, a small part of the Olomouc Region around the city of Jeseník. After Ostrava, the most important cities are Opava and Český Těšín. Historically Český Těšín is the western part of the city of Cieszyn which nowadays lies in Poland.

Situated in the Sudetes, it is cornered by the Carpathians in the east. Its major rivers are the Oder (Polish), Opava and Olše (which forms part of the natural border with Poland).

History

Modern-day Czech Silesia derives primarily from a small part of Silesia that remained within the Bohemian Crown and the Habsburg monarchy at the end of the First Silesian War in 1742, when the rest of Silesia was ceded to Prussia. It was re-organised as the Duchy of Upper and Lower Silesia, with its capital at Opava. In 1900, the Duchy occupied an area of 5,140 km² and had a population of 670,000.

In 1918, the former Duchy formed part of the newly created state of Czechoslovakia, except for Cieszyn Silesia, which was split between Czechoslovakia and Poland in 1920, Czechoslovakia gaining its western portion. Hlučín Region, formerly part of Prussian Silesia, also became part of Czechoslovakia under the Treaty of Versailles in 1920.

Following the Munich Agreement of 1938, most of Czech Silesia became part of the Reichsgau Sudetenland and Poland occupied the Zaolzie area on the west bank of the Olza (the Polish gains being lost when Germany occupied Poland the following year).

With the exception of the areas around Cieszyn, Ostrava, and Hlučín, Czech Silesia was predominantly settled by German-speaking populations up until 1945. Following the Second World War, Czech Silesia and Hlučínsko were returned to Czechoslovakia and the ethnic Germans were expelled. The border with Poland was once again set along the Olza (although not confirmed by treaty until 1958).

People

The population mainly speaks Czech with altered vowels. Some of the native Slavic population speak Lach, which is classed by Ethnologue as a dialect of Czech, although it also shows some similarities to Polish. In Cieszyn Silesia, a unique dialect is also spoken, mostly by members of the Polish minority there.

Notable people from Czech Silesia include:

 Martin of Opava (Martinus Polonus) (†1278), chronicler, chaplain of several popes
 Jiří Třanovský (1592–1637), pastor and hymnwriter, the "Luther of the Slavs"
 Heinrich Franz Boblig von Edelstadt (c. 1612–1698), egregious inquisitor
 David Zeisberger (1721–1808), Moravian Missionary in North America and "Apostle to the Indians"
 Gregor Mendel (1822–1884), biologist, founder of genetics (inheritance laws)
 Hans Kudlich (1823–1917), politician, main figure in the struggle for abolition of serfdom in Austrian Empire
 Paweł Stalmach (1824–1891), journalist and national revivalist
 Vincenc Prasek (1843–1912), historian
 Johann Palisa (1848–1925), astronomer
 Petr Bezruč (1867–1958), poet
 Josef Koždon (1873–1949), politician, leader of Silesian autonomists, proponent of the idea of a distinct Silesian nation ("Slonzaks")
 Helen Zelezny-Scholz (1882–1974), architectural sculptor
 Óndra Łysohorsky (1905–1989), poet, creator of the literary form of the Lach dialect
 Joy Adamson (Friederike Victoria Gessner) (1910–1980), writer
 František Vláčil (1924–1999), film director and screenwriter
 Armin Delong (1925–2017), physicist specializing in electron microscopy
 Věra Chytilová (1929–2014), film director and screenwriter
 Jaromír Nohavica (1953–), songwriter and poet
 Iva Bittová (1958–), avant-garde violinist, singer, and composer
 Ivan Lendl (1960–), tennis player, longtime world #1 and winner of eight Grand Slam titles (finalist of nineteen)
 Leon Koudelak (1961–) classical guitarist

References

 
Silesia
Geography of the Moravian-Silesian Region
Geography of the Olomouc Region
Historical regions

Silesia